Route 76 is a highway in the west half of southern Missouri running between U.S. Route 60 and U.S. Route 63 at Willow Springs and the Oklahoma state line near Tiff City where it continues as a county road.  It bypasses Branson on the Ozark Mountain High Road and is the namesake of the Branson strip, 76 Country Blvd. The road runs for its entirety through the Missouri Ozarks, and is at times very hilly and curvy.

Route description
Route 76 begins at Willow Springs.  Within a couple of miles, the highways enters the Mark Twain National Forest, which it leaves after .  At the Douglas County line it begins a   concurrency with Route 181.  North of Vanzant is an intersection with Route 95, and  further west is the northern junction with Route 5.  On the west side of Ava, Route 76/Route 5 has an intersection with Route 14, and south of Ava, Route 76 will turn west off Route 5.

At Brownbranch, the highway enters another part of the Mark Twain National Forest, and at Bradleyville, it has a short concurrency with Route 125.  At Kissee Mills, the road turns west with U.S. Route 160 and the two are united to Forsyth.  At Forsyth, Route 76 leaves US 160 and crosses Bull Shoals Lake.  At Branson, the road crosses Lake Taneycomo and meets U.S. Route 65.

Route 76 runs concurrent with US 65 for  before exiting onto the Ozark Mountain Highroad Freeway. While on the freeway, Route 76 has an interchange with Route 248. At the west end of the highroad, Route 76 returns to its original route at an incomplete interchange, connecting with Route 376. On the west side of Branson, a concurrency with Route 265 begins; at Branson West, a concurrency with Route 13 begins.  At Reeds Spring, Route 76 turns west towards Cape Fair.  At Cape Fair is the southern terminus of Route 173.

At the Barry County line, Route 76 enters the Mark Twain National Forest for a third time. Eight miles into the forest is a short, one-mile (1.6 km) concurrency with Route 39. At Cassville is a short concurrency with Route 112 and an intersection with Route 37. The road becomes less winding and hilly in this area.

At Wheaton, Route 86 turns north.  Route 76 continues west through McDonald County.  At Anderson, Route 76 has an interchange with Interstate 49/U.S. Route 71, and just west is a two-mile (3 km) concurrency with Route 59.  Seven miles west of Anderson, the highway joins Route 43, turning north with that highway three miles.  At the northwest junction, Route 76 turns west for one mile (1.6 km) and enters Tiff City.  The western limit of Tiff City is the Oklahoma state line, where Route 76 becomes a county road on the county line of Ottawa County and Delaware County, Oklahoma.

History
Route 76 was initially designated in 1922, running from south of Spokane to Forsyth. The longer Route 78 passed through Forsyth on its path between Branson and the northeast corner of Taney County. In about 1929, Route 76 was extended west to Reeds Spring, and in the early 1930s Route 78 was extended northeast to Ava. With the extension of Route 80 west from Gainesville in the 1930s or 1940s, Route 78 west of Forsyth became part of Route 80, and the rest was absorbed into Route 76, which now connected Reeds Spring to Ava. US 160, designated in Missouri in the mid-1950s, initially followed Route 80 to Branson. It later moved to Route 76 west of Forsyth, and Route 76 was extended west via Branson, replacing part of Route 148 and much of Route 44. Route 44 had been designated in 1922 from Anderson to Abesville, and later extended west to Tiff City and east to Rockaway Beach. In the late 1950s, it was split up due to I-44, becoming Route 76 west of Cassville, Route 148 from Cassville to Galena, and a new Route 176 from Galena to Rockaway Beach.

In 1967-68 Route 76 was extended from Route 5 two miles north of Ava east along former State Route F through northeast Douglas County and other county roads to US 60/US 63 at Willow Springs in Howell County. This added approximately 53 miles plus a four-mile concurrence with Missouri Route 5 west of Ava.

Prior to January 2020, Route 76 ran along 76 Country Boulevard through Branson, where many of the entertainment theaters for which Branson is famous can be found. This alignment was plagued with traffic during much of the day and especially towards show start and end times (usually around 6-8 PM and 9-10PM). At the west end of the highroad, Route 76 returns to its original route, with its former routing through the interchange signed as Route 376.

Major intersections

References

076
Transportation in McDonald County, Missouri
Transportation in Barry County, Missouri
Transportation in Stone County, Missouri
Transportation in Taney County, Missouri
Transportation in Douglas County, Missouri
Transportation in Howell County, Missouri